Reshetnikovo is a rural locality (a village) in Kubenskoye Rural Settlement, Vologodsky District, Vologda Oblast, Russia. The population was 3 as of 2002.

Geography 
Reshetnikovo is located 48 km northwest of Vologda (the district's administrative centre) by road. Kocheurovo is the nearest rural locality.

References 

Rural localities in Vologodsky District